Demidovsky is a rural locality (a khutor) in Suslovsky Selsoviet, Birsky District, Bashkortostan, Russia. The population was 10 as of 2010. There is 1 street.

Geography 
Demidovsky is located 15 km northeast of Birsk (the district's administrative centre) by road. Shestykovo is the nearest rural locality.

References 

Rural localities in Birsky District